Eimeria bufomarini is a species of coccidium, known to infect the epithelial cells of the intestines of Brazilian cane toads.

References

 

Conoidasida
Protists described in 1995
Apicomplexa species